Colle Santa Lucia (Ladin language: Col) is a comune (municipality) in the Province of Belluno in the Italian region of Veneto, located about  north of Venice and about  northwest of Belluno. The population speaks a Venetian dialect called Ladin Venetian that is heavily influenced by the Ladin language.

Colle Santa Lucia borders the following municipalities: Alleghe, Cortina d'Ampezzo, Livinallongo del Col di Lana, Rocca Pietore, San Vito di Cadore, Selva di Cadore.

Demographic evolution

References

Tyrol (region)
Cities and towns in Veneto